Elizabeth Thorn Scott Flood (née Elizabeth Thorn; 1828–1867) was a 19th-century African American educator and activist in California. Scott Flood was a "colored school" teacher in Sacramento, California and later fought for equal education rights for all children in Oakland, California.

Early life and education 
Elizabeth Thorn was born a free woman in 1828 in New York state. In New Bedford, Massachusetts, she received a good education, and married her first husband, Joseph Scott. 

In 1852, now Elizabeth Thorn Scott, she moved to California with her husband Joseph and settled in Placerville. Joseph worked as a gold miner and died shortly after their arrival, leaving Scott Flood alone to care for their son Oliver. Feeling that Placerville was not the adequate place for an African American widow and her young son, Scott Flood and Oliver moved to Sacramento, which had a sizable African American population.

Educator and activist 
Arriving in Sacramento, Scott Flood attempted to enroll Oliver in the local public school but was unable to do so since public schools did not accept African American students, not by law, but by tradition.  Thus, with the help of the local African Methodist Episcopal (AME) church, Saint Andrews African Methodist Episcopal Church, in May 1854, Elizabeth Thorn Scott opened, at her home, a small private school for non-white children on Second Street, between M and N Streets. In the small private school, Scott Flood was the teacher and received a salary of $50 a month, which was paid by the parents of the students attending the school. Scott Flood's school initially had only African American students, but before long, she began to take in Native and Asian American students as well. At that school, students were not only children. They ranged in age from four, to twenty nine years old. A few months later, the Sacramento school board decided to take over administration of the school but not to provide funding, and arrangement that Scott Flood accepted but without giving up her fight for equal rights for her students.

Activism and education in Oakland, California 
In 1855, Scott Flood attended the first California State Convention of Colored Citizens in Sacramento. In that convention, African American activists from all backgrounds, strategized how to lobby California politicians for better representation and basic civil rights, such as the right to vote. 

During that year, she met her second husband, Isaac Flood. Isaac was a freed slave who had been born in South Carolina and freed at the age of 22. Flood was twelve years older than Scott Flood and also had a son.  The couple and their two children soon moved to Brooklyn, California, a thriving small community near Oakland. By 1857, Scott Flood and Isaac opened a school for African American children at their home on East 15th Street. At the time, African American children did not have access to public schools in Oakland.  

By 1858, the Floods had three children, were involved in the community, and were one of the most prominent and progressive families in the area. That same year, they helped start the Shiloh African Methodist Episcopal (Shiloh AME) church, the first African Methodist Episcopal church in the area. In 1863, the church purchased an old 20 by 30 building and moved it to Second and Market Streets. The building had been an old school for white children that been abandoned. With that building, the Shiloh AME took over the school and used the building for church services as well as the school. 

Scott Flood continued to teach at the school until her death in 1867. The local school laws did not allow African American students into public schools until 1872, but in 1866, it opened up government funded schools for African American and other non-white children. The Shiloh AME school operated for ten years before closing its doors in 1873.

Death and legacy     
Scott Flood died unexpectedly in 1867 at age 39. She left behind her husband Issac and five children, including Lydia Flood Jackson. 

Although Scott never saw the desegregation of schools, in 1872 the city of Brooklyn began to accept African Americans in its schools following a similar decision by the Oakland School Board. That same year, Brooklyn was annexed to Oakland. Scott Flood's youngest daughter, Lydia Flood Jackson was one of the first African American students to attend Oakland schools in 1872. By 1875, all African American schools in the area were closed, and in 1880, the law was changed in the state of California outlawing school segregation.

See also 
African Americans in California
African-American history
African American Women
Civil rights movement (1865–1896)
Phoenixonian Institute, the first African American high school in California
Ward v. Flood, 1874 California Supreme Court case on racial segregation

References

External links 
Newspaper clipping of the death notice of Mrs. Jackson Flood  Scott Flood is mentioned
Brief Biography of Mrs. Jackson Flood, where her mother Mrs. Scoot Flood is mentioned.
Flood Family Papers - University of California

1828 births
1867 deaths
American women educators
African-American educators
American educators
African Americans in California